Jamnabai Narsee School is a private school in Juhu, Mumbai, Maharashtra, India. It was founded on 17 January 1971 and is managed by the Narsee Monjee Education Trust. The school building is unusual and unique in architecture with three clusters of hexagonal classrooms, each with a central foyer. The school is attended by children from mostly Juhu, and its alumni include several famous dignitaries and celebrities.

History
Jamnabai Narsee School was founded on 17 January 1971. It was established and managed by the Narsee Monjee Educational Trust. It is a co-educational, English medium school.

This school is an 'Unaided Linguistic-Minority Institution', affiliated to the Council for the Indian School Certificate Examinations-New Delhi, and to International Baccalaureate Organisation, Geneva preparing students for the Indian Certificate of Secondary Education (ICSE) Examination at the end of the 10th grade and the International Baccalaureate Diploma (IBDP) at the end of the 12th.

Motto
The motto of the school is "Vidya Param Balama" which means "Knowledge is Strength Supreme". The guiding principle of the school is "Let learning be a joy and teaching be a pleasure" where opportunities are provided leading to the process of self-improvement.

Timeline

1971 Inauguration of the School - I.C.S.E and S.S.C. streams; introduction of the house system; start of Health Care Unit.
 1972 Inauguration of the Math Laboratory
 1974 Election of student council
 1979 Inception of the Parent - Teacher Association
 1984 Inception of the Jamnabai Narsee Alumni Association; first issue of the directory of the graduating class titled SMRUTI
 1987 Celebration of the Centenary Year of Shri Narsee Monjee; starting of the Narsee Monjee Inter- School Hindi Elocution
 1988 Inauguration of the Computer Section
 1991 Inauguration of the Social Studies Room
 1992 Hosting of the All India Conference of the Principals of ICSE Schools.
 1993 Inauguration of the Audio - Visual Room; starting the 'CASCADE' festival by J.N.A.A.
 1996 Celebration of the Silver Jubilee Year
 1997 Establishment of the Reading Rooms in the Dixit Road Municipal School, Vile Parle (East) by the P.T.A
 1999 Starting of the Dyslexia Awareness Programme
 2000 Inauguration of the Life Enrichment Centre; inauguration of Activity Centre for pre-school; inauguration of Science Activity Centre
 2005 Inauguration of IB Diploma Programme for Grade 11 and 12.
 2006 Celebration of Coral Jubilee - 35 years; addition of 5th and 6th floors; starting the Resource Centre for handicapped students.
 2007 Inauguration of the Activity Room; the inception of the International General Certificate of Secondary Education Programme -CHECKPOINT - Std 8; Inception of Std. 11 - ISC - Arts, and Commerce Stream; established the rainwater harvesting system.
 2010 First Inter IB School Football (Soccer) Championship. The winning Team was Kodaikanal, coached by Sither.
2013 Introduction of a new school uniform for the ICSE students. First ICSE Art Exhibition.
2014 Jasmine Madhani inaugurates a new academic sweatshop program.
2015 Abhisekh Bachchan inaugurates the NBC Standard basketball court on 4 January.
2016 Jamnabai Narsee School organized the 15th Special Sports Meet
2020 Jamnabai Narsee School celebrates its 50th year.

Facilities
The school compound has courts for basketball, volleyball, throwball, and handball, to cater to the physical education program of the school. The school has leased an adjacent public maidan and converted it into a playground for the students.

The building has a total built-up area of 300,200 sq. feet and a carpet area of more than 200,000 sq. feet.

In addition to these, there are rooms for academic activities such as the Technical Drawing Room, the Art Room, the Maths Laboratory, the Environmental Science room, and rooms for Bharat Natyam, Kathak and folk dance, a library, stationery, copy room, science labs, fashion designing room, the sitar room, rooms for Indian and Western Music and 4 modern Computer Centers.

The entire central area on the first floor is the arena for cultural activities. The Physics/Biology/Chemistry laboratories and the Science Activity Center are on the second floor. The school hall with a mezzanine floor caters to the needs of an audience of 1100.

The school employs 175 teachers and support staff, and another 100 peons. Enrollment is 7500 students. Every year approximately 360 candidates are prepared and sent up for the ICSE examinations, the highest of any Mumbai school. The principal is Zeenat Bhojaboy (ex-vice principal), who took over the position in 2015.

In the news
The school recently made headlines in newspapers when Jamnabai Narsee student Juhi Kajaria scored AIR 1 in the ICSE examinations held in March 2019. She scored an astounding 99.6%. Other students Forum Sanjanwala and Jugal Patel got AIR 2 and AIR 3 respectively.

In 2013, a conductor, on a bus service that worked with the school, was convicted for sexually molesting a three-year-old preschool student while she was being dropped home by the school bus.

Notable alumni
 Abhishek Bachchan, Bollywood actor
 Alia Bhatt, Bollywood actress
 Abhay Deol, Bollywood actor
 Esha Deol, Bollywood actress
 Alaya Furniturewala, Bollywood actress
 Emraan Hashmi, Bollywood actor
 Tulip Joshi, Bollywood actress
 Rahul Kamerkar, lawyer and author
 Kareena Kapoor, Bollywood actress
 Shraddha Kapoor, Bollywood actress
 Ishaan Khattar, Bollywood actor
 Armaan Malik, singer-songwriter
 Amaal Mallik, Bollywood music director and composer
 Ayan Mukerji, Bollywood film director
 Bhushan Patel, Bollywood director
 Utkarsh Sharma, Bollywood actor
 Raveena Tandon, Bollywood actress
 Minoti Vaishnav, Hollywood screenwriter and singer

References

External links
 Official website

Private schools in Mumbai
Educational institutions established in 1971
International Baccalaureate schools in India
1971 establishments in Maharashtra